This is the list of cathedrals in Burkina Faso.

Roman Catholic
Cathedrals of the Roman Catholic Church in Burkina Faso:

 Cathedral of St. Peter in Banfora
 Cathedral of Our Lady of Lourdes in Bobo-Dioulasso
 Cathedral of St. Ann in Dédougou
 Cathedral of Sts. Peter and Paul in Diébougou
 Cathedral of St. Ann in Dori
 Cathedral of St. Joseph in Fada N’Gourma
 Cathedral of the Sacred Heart in Gaoua
 Cathedral of Our Lady of Kaya in Kaya
 Cathedral of St. Augustine in Koudougou
 Cathedral of Our Lady of Graces in Koupéla
 Cathedral of Our Lady of the Assumption in Manga
 Cathedral of Our Lady of Perpetual Help in Nouna
 Cathedral of the Immaculate Conception in Ouagadougou
 Cathédrale Notre Dame de la Délivrance in Ouahigouya
Cathedral of Maria Regina in Tenkodogo

See also
List of cathedrals

References

Churches in Burkina Faso
Burkina Faso
Cathedrals
Cathedrals